L.R.V. standing for Left-Right-Video, is a connector widely used in Villa Monarchy television network from 2004 to 2010.

Audiovisual connectors